HMS Espiegle (J216) was a turbine engine-powered  during the Second World War.

Design and description

The ships' complement consisted of 85 officers and ratings.

The reciprocating ships had two vertical triple-expansion steam engines, each driving one shaft, using steam provided by two Admiralty three-drum boilers.

The Algerine class was armed with a QF  Mk V anti-aircraft gun and four twin-gun mounts for Oerlikon 20 mm cannon. The latter guns were in short supply when the first ships were being completed and they often got a proportion of single mounts. By 1944, single-barrel Bofors 40 mm mounts began replacing the twin 20 mm mounts on a one for one basis. All of the ships were fitted for four throwers and two rails for depth charges.

Construction and career
The ship was ordered on 15 November 1940 at the Harland & Wolff at Belfast, Ireland. She was laid down on 5 February 1942 and launched on 12 August 1942. The ship was commissioned on 1 December 1942 and in April, she was put into the 12th Minesweeping Flotilla.

In May 1943, she was nominated for joint operations with 13th Minesweeping Flotilla for mine clearance of passage through Galita and Sicilian Channels during Operation Antidote. In June, she was nominated for minesweeping and escort duties during the Operation Husky. In September, she was deployed for minesweeping support of Operation Avalanche. In December, she was chosen to take part in the Operation Shingle.

On 14 July 1944, the ship took part in operation to clear a channel to Port of Leghorn with ships of the 19th and 13th Minesweeping Flotilla during Operation Lobster. In October, she was nominated for minesweeping service with her Flotilla in support of the Operation Manna.

From October 1945 until 1948, the ship and her flotilla intercepted ships carrying illegal immigrants into Palestine. The ship was transferred to the 5th Flotilla in December 1946 and put into the reserve fleet in the UK in 1948.

In 1966, she was sold to BISCO for scrap by the Arnott Young at Dalmuir in which she arrived in March 1967.

References

Bibliography
 
 
 Peter Elliott (1977) Allied Escort Ships of World War II. MacDonald & Janes,

External links
 

 

Algerine-class minesweepers of the Royal Navy
Ships built in Belfast
1942 ships
World War II minesweepers of the United Kingdom